The 2003 Campeonato Paulista de Futebol Profissional da Primeira Divisão - Série A1 was the 102nd season of São Paulo's top professional football league. Corinthians won the championship by the 25th time. Botafogo-SP and Internacional de Limeira were relegated.

Format
On the first stage, the 21 teams are split in 3 groups with 7 teams each. In each group, every team play against all the other teams in the same group. The first and second teams from each group qualify to the quarterfinals. The two best teams in the overall standings also qualify. The 12 worst teams advance to the relegation tournament.

The quarterfinals are played in one-leg, and the semifinals and the finals are played in two-leg. On the relegation tournament, the twelve teams are split in two groups of six. Each team plays against all the teams in the other group. The worst club in this stage standings is relegated, and the second worst club has to play a relegation playoff match against the runner-up from the second division.

Participating teams

First stage

Group 1

Group 2

Group 3

Relegation tournament

Group A

Group B

Results

Relegation playoff
The team with the second worst campaign plays against the runner-up from the second division of the state championship.

Atlético Sorocaba is promoted to the state championship's first division, and Botafogo-SP is relegated to the second division.

Final stage

Quarterfinals

Semifinals

First leg

Second leg

Finals

Final standings

References

External links

Campeonato Paulista seasons
Paulista